William Sumner Wakefield (born May 24, 1941) is a former pitcher in Major League Baseball who played for the New York Mets during the 1964 season. A native of Kansas City, Missouri, he attended the Pembroke Country-Day School and Stanford University.

Wakefield was signed as an amateur free agent by the St. Louis Cardinals in 1961. On November 4, 1963, Wakefield along with George Altman were traded to the New York Mets in exchange for Roger Craig.  
 
In one season career, Wakefield posted a 3–5 record with a 3.61 ERA in 62 appearances, including four starts and two saves, giving up 48 earned runs on 103 hits and 61 walks while striking out 61 in 119.2 innings of work.

References

External links

Major League Baseball pitchers
New York Mets players
Lancaster Red Roses players
Atlanta Crackers players
Williamsport Mets players
Buffalo Bisons (minor league) players
Salt Lake City Bees players
Baseball players from Kansas City, Missouri
Stanford University alumni
1941 births
Living people
Tulsa Oilers (baseball) players